Monica Vernon (born October 19, 1957) is an American politician. She is a former two-term member of the Cedar Rapids City Council and the former Mayor Pro Tempore of Cedar Rapids, Iowa.

Vernon was elected to the Cedar Rapids City Council in 2007 as a Republican to represent District 2. In 2009, she switched her party affiliation to the Democratic Party.

In 2014, Vernon was defeated in the Democratic primary election for Iowa's 1st congressional district. That same year, she was an unsuccessful nominee for Lieutenant Governor of Iowa, running alongside Jack Hatch. In 2016, she won the Democratic nomination in Iowa's 1st congressional district. She was defeated by incumbent Republican Rod Blum in the general election.

In 2017, she unsuccessfully ran for mayor of Cedar Rapids.

Early life and education
Vernon was born on the Francis E. Warren Air Force Base in Cheyenne, Wyoming. She graduated from Regis Catholic High School in Cedar Rapids, Iowa.

Vernon attended the University of Iowa and received her B.A. in journalism  in 1980. Vernon received her M.B.A. from the Tippie College of Business at the University of Iowa in 1999. She later worked as an adjunct professor at the University of Iowa.

Private sector career
Vernon worked as associate director of college relations at Dickinson State University from 1980 to 1981. She was a reporter for  The Gazette from 1981 through 1983. From 1983 through 1985, she was the director of public information for Mount Mercy University. From 1985 through 1987, she was a market research consultant for Frank N. Magid Associates.

In 1987, Vernon founded the Vernon Research Group, a privately-owned market research firm. Vernon was the company's president and CEO until it was purchased in 2013 by The Gazette Company.

Political career

Cedar Rapids City Council
In 2007, Vernon was elected to represent Cedar Rapids' 2nd district on the City Council. In 2009, Vernon switched her party registration to the Democratic Party and supported a one cent local option sales and services tax to help with flood recovery.

After the Iowa flood of 2008, Vernon, as a member of the city council, helped create a post-flood redevelopment map.

2014 elections
In the fall of 2013, Vernon announced she was running for Congress in Iowa's 1st congressional district. She came in second behind former Iowa House Speaker Pat Murphy in the five-way primary for the seat vacated by Bruce Braley. That seat was eventually won by Republican Rod Blum.

After that loss, in June 2014, Jack Hatch asked Vernon to join him on the Democratic ticket as his lieutenant governor running mate in the Iowa gubernatorial election, 2014. Hatch and Vernon ran against Republican incumbent Terry Branstad and lost 59% to 37%.

2016 election

On January 15, 2015, Vernon announced her bid for Iowa's 1st congressional district in the 2016 election. Vernon won the Democratic primary against Pat Murphy on June 7, 2016. She faced incumbent Republican Rod Blum in the general election. Blum defeated Vernon with 54% of the vote.

2017 election
Vernon ran for Cedar Rapids Mayor in 2017 but lost, marking her fourth electoral defeat in four years.

Personal life

Vernon married her husband, Bill Vernon, in 1984. The couple has three adult daughters.

Electoral history

References

External links
 Monica Vernon for Mayor

1957 births
Living people
Iowa Democrats
Iowa city council members
Politicians from Cheyenne, Wyoming
University of Iowa alumni
Iowa Republicans
Women city councillors in Iowa
Politicians from Cedar Rapids, Iowa
21st-century American women politicians
21st-century American politicians